Fawcett Forest is a former civil parish, now in the parish of Selside and Fawcett Forest, in the South Lakeland district of the English county of Cumbria. It included the valley of Bannisdale. The parish had a population of 23 in 2001. Owing to the minimal population from the 2011 Census details are included in the civil parish of Whitwell and Selside.

History 
Fawcett Forest was a township in the parish of Kendal until 1866 when it became a separate civil parish. On 1 April 2020 the parish was abolished and merged with Whitwell and Selside to form "Selside and Fawcett Forest".

See also

Listed buildings in Fawcett Forest

References

External links
 Cumbria County History Trust: Fawcett Forest (nb: provisional research only – see Talk page)

Former civil parishes in Cumbria
South Lakeland District